John Calvert is the holder of the Henry W. Casper, SJ Associate Professorship in History at Creighton University.  He is the author of several academic works on radical Islam, most notably one on the Islamist intellectual Sayyid Qutb entitled Sayyid Qutb and the Origins of Radical Islamism.

Publications
 
  In 349 libraries according to WorldCat
  In 416 libraries according to WorldCat

References

External links 
 Faculty Page Creighton University

Living people
21st-century American historians
Creighton University faculty
McGill University alumni
Year of birth missing (living people)